Friedli is a surname. Notable people with the surname include:

 Simon Friedli (born 1991), Swiss bobsledder
Edgar Friedli (born 1933), Swiss long-distance runner
Roman Friedli (born 1979), Swiss footballer
Sandra Friedli (born 1974), Swiss slalom canoeist
Seraina Friedli (born 1993), Swiss footballer
Thomas Friedli (1946–2008), Swiss clarinetist